Zamudio is a railway station in Zamudio, Basque Country, Spain. It is owned by Euskal Trenbide Sarea and operated by Euskotren. It lies on the Txorierri line.

History 
The station was opened together with the Txorierri line in 1894. It was renovated in 2018 after trains on the Txorierri line started running through metro line 3.

Services 
The station is served by Euskotren Trena line E3. It runs every 15 minutes (in each direction) during weekdays, and every 30 minutes during weekends.

References 

Euskotren Trena stations
Railway stations in Biscay
Railway stations in Spain opened in 1894